Yalata Mission Airport (IATA:KYI, ICAO:YYTA) is a small, regional airport that serves the small community of Yalata, South Australia.

Facilities 
The airport has one runway made of asphalt with a heading of approximately 12/30 and length of 1200 m (3937 ft).

References 

Airports in South Australia